"Suffocate" is a track by the UK rock band Feeder, re-recorded from their 1997 album Polythene. It was released as an in-between single to bridge the gap between Polythene and its follow-up, Yesterday Went Too Soon. Feeder later repeated this in-between single process building up to a following album, with "Just a Day" in 2001 and "Shatter" / "Tender" in 2005. The single reached the UK Singles Chart, peaking at number 37.

The version of "Suffocate" released as a single is a full-band version of the acoustic track from the Polythene album, with slightly amended lyrics. The song began in 1994 as part of the band's demo under the name "Give".  At that time, the band was called Real. At the time of its single release, Grant Nicholas said that he wanted to revisit the song.

Frontman Grant also once said that "Give" was the song that secured the band's record deal, which in turn was one of the reasons for its inclusion on The Singles album.

Track listing

CD1
 "Suffocate" (single version)
 "Eclipse"
 "Cockroach"
 "High" (Live from Reading 97' video)

CD2
 "Suffocate" (single version)
 "Dry" (acoustic)
 "Spill"
 "Descend" (Live from Reading 97' video)

7" vinyl (Dark Purple)
 "Suffocate" (single version)
 "Eclipse"

References

1998 singles
Feeder songs
Song recordings produced by Chris Sheldon
1997 songs
The Echo Label singles
Songs written by Grant Nicholas